Messier 53 (also known as M53 or NGC 5024) is a globular cluster in the Coma Berenices constellation. It was discovered by Johann Elert Bode in 1775. M53 is one of the more outlying globular clusters, being about  light-years away from the Galactic Center, and almost the same distance (about ) from the Solar System. The cluster has a core radius (rc) of 2.18 pc, a half-light radius (rh) of 5.84 pc, and a tidal radius (rtr) of 239.9 pc.

This is considered a metal-poor cluster and at one time was thought to be the most metal-poor cluster in the Milky Way. Abundance measurements of cluster members on the red giant branch show that most are first-generation stars. That is, they did not form from gas recycled from previous generations of stars. This differs from the majority of globular clusters that are more dominated by second generation stars. The second generation stars in NGC 5024 tend to be more concentrated in the core region. Overall, the stellar composition of cluster members is similar to members of the Milky Way halo.

The cluster displays various tidal-like features including clumps and ripples around the cluster, and tails along the cluster's orbit in an east–west direction. A tidal bridge-like structure appears to connect M53 with the close, very diffuse neighbor NGC 5053, as well as an envelope surrounding both clusters. These may indicate a dynamic tidal interaction has occurred between the two clusters; a possibly unique occurrence within the Milky Way since there are no known binary clusters within the galaxy. In addition, M53 is a candidate member of the Sagittarius dwarf galaxy tidal stream.

Among the variable star population in the cluster, there are 55 known to be RR Lyrae variables. Of these, a majority of 34 display behavior typical of the Blazhko effect, including 23 of type RRc – the largest known population of the latter in any globular cluster. There are also at least three variables of type SX Phe and a semi-regular red giant.

Gallery

See also
 List of Messier objects

Notes

References

External links

 SEDS: Messier Object 53
 Messier 53, Galactic Globular Clusters Database page
 
 

Messier 053
Messier 053
053
Messier 053
Astronomical objects discovered in 1775
Discoveries by Johann Elert Bode